Ems-Supérieur ("Upper Ems") was a department of the First French Empire in present-day Germany. It was formed in 1811, when the region was annexed by France. Its territory was part of the present-day German lands Lower Saxony and North Rhine-Westphalia. Its capital was Osnabrück. 

The department was subdivided into the following arrondissements and cantons (situation in 1812):

 Osnabrück, cantons: Bramsche, Dissen, Bad Essen, Bad Iburg, Lengerich, Melle, Osnabrück (3 cantons), Ostbevern, Ostercappeln, Tecklenburg and Versmold. 
 Minden, cantons: Petershagen, Bünde, Enger, Levern, Lübbecke, Minden, Quernheim, Rahden, Uchte and Werther. 
 Quakenbrück, cantons: Ankum, Cloppenburg, Diepholz, Dinklage, Friesoythe, Löningen, Quakenbrück, Vechta, Vörden and Wildeshausen.
 Lingen, cantons: Bevergern, Freren, Fürstenau, Haselünne, Ibbenbüren, Lingen, Meppen, Papenburg and Sögel.

Its population in 1812 was 415,018.

After Napoleon was defeated in 1814, most of the department became part of the Kingdom of Hanover.

References

Former departments of France in Germany
1811 establishments in the First French Empire